Robert Jacob Gordon (29 September 1743, in Doesburg, Gelderland – 25 October 1795, in Cape Town) was a Dutch explorer, soldier, artist, naturalist and linguist of Scottish descent.

Life

Robert Jacob Gordon was the son of Maj. General Jacob Gordon of the Scots Brigade (1572–1782) in the service of the Netherlands. Although of Scottish descent, Robert Gordon's allegiance and service lay with the Netherlands. He joined the Dutch Light Dragoons as a cadet in 1753 and enrolled at the University of Harderwijk in 1759. Here he studied in the humanities and soon proved to be of exceptional intelligence with diverse interests. He served at first with the Scots Brigade and later joined the Dutch East India Company, rising to the rank of colonel and commanding the Cape garrison between 1780 and 1795 and lived in the manor house known as Schoonder Sight. He went on more expeditions than any other 18th-century explorer of southern Africa. Of the six journeys he undertook, only four between 1777 and 1786 are covered by journals discovered in 1964. He was responsible for naming the Orange River, introducing Merino sheep to the Cape Colony and for the discovery of the remains of  Bartolomeu Dias's padrão at Kwaaihoek in 1786. In addition to French, Dutch and English, he spoke the indigenous languages KhoeKhoe and Xhosa.

First trip (1773–1774)
During 1772/73 Robert visited the Cape Colony and met Carl Peter Thunberg and Francis Masson. They undertook a trip on foot exploring the mountains between Cape Town and False Bay.

Besides his excursion with Thunberg and Masson, Gordon undertook one long journey during this period at the Cape, but there is no known record of his route.

Second trip (1777–1778)
He returned to the Cape in 1777 with the rank of captain. He set out on a second trip from 6 October 1777 to 8 March 1778 together with William Paterson, the botanist, collector and affable companion, who soon turned back due to illness, and Johannes Schumacher/Schoemaker, an artist, Gordon left Cape Town for Swellendam. From there via Plattekloof to Beervlei and on to present-day Aberdeen. He continued across the Sneeuwberg to a point slightly west of Colesberg. He then roughly retraced his outbound route as far as the Sneeuwberg, the heading south-east to Cookhouse, from where he made various forays to meet Xhosa chiefs.

One of Gordon's goals on this trip was reaching the Groote River, doing so by going north up the Great Fish, Tarka and Vlekpoort rivers to the confluence of the Groote River with the Caledon.

Schoemaker accompanied Gordon on all his journeys, producing a fine record of their travels and causing present-day confusion as to which sketches are his and which Gordon's. Gordon was a diligent recorder of data such as altitude, compass headings and hours travelled and other information which he would later incorporate in a great map he planned. Paterson recorded that one of his aims on this trip was to meet with Xhosa chiefs near present-day Somerset East.

For most of his journey he followed a well-travelled route, sometimes joined by others going the same way. His equipment was carried by a single wagon, while he was on horseback, ranging across the veld, observing, recording and occasionally hunting.

Third trip (1778)
A third trip lasting from September to October 1778, was made in the company of Governor van Plettenberg to the north-eastern frontiers of the Colony.

Death (1795)
As commander of the garrison, Gordon was responsible for the Cape's defense. In 1794-1795, the French successfully invaded the Netherlands. As a result, the Prince of Orange, as Stadtholder, the de facto head of state of the Dutch Republic, fled to England. In 1795, a British fleet arrived at the Cape claiming that they had instructions to occupy the colony in the Prince of Orange's name. Gordon initially complied, but was later accused of treason by his own soldiers for allowing the British occupation. Gordon had become an outcast and a target of derision and violence. On 25 October 1795 he committed suicide at his house Schoonder Sight.

References

Botanical Exploration of Southern Africa - Mary Gunn & L.E. Codd (AA Balkema, Cape Town, 1981)
[Dutch] Een Nederlander in de Wildernis: De Ontdekkingsreizen van Robert Jacob Gordon (1743-1795) in Zuid-Afrika - Luc Panhuysen (Rijksmuseum Nieuw Amsterdam Uitgevers, Amsterdam, 2010)
Robert Jacob Gordon 1743-1795: The Man and His Travels at the Cape - Patrick Cullinan (Winchester Struik, Cape Town, 1992)

External links

Robert Jacob Gordon - Patrick Cullinan
 Robert Jacob Gordon: Diaries, letters and drawings

1743 births
1795 deaths
Dutch emigrants to South Africa
18th-century Dutch explorers
Dutch people of Scottish descent
People from Doesburg
University of Harderwijk alumni
Dutch East India Company people
Explorers of Africa